Luis Camacaro (born 24 November 1967) is a Venezuelan footballer. He played in three matches for the Venezuela national football team in 1989. He was also part of Venezuela's squad for the 1989 Copa América tournament.

References

External links
 

1967 births
Living people
Venezuelan footballers
Venezuela international footballers
Place of birth missing (living people)
Association football midfielders
20th-century Venezuelan people